The Embassy of Niger in Washington, D.C. is the diplomatic mission of the Republic of Niger to the United States. The embassy is located at 2204 R Street, Northwest, Washington, D.C., just off Embassy Row. 

Until his death on December 16, 2020, the Ambassador of Niger to the United States was Abdallah Wafy.  Since February 2, 2022, the Ambassador has been , a development economist.

See also
 Niger - United States relations
 List of Washington, D.C. embassies

References

External links

Official website
wikimapia

Washington, D.C.
Niger
Niger–United States relations